The third season of The Masked Singer Australia was renewed in October 2020 and premiered on Monday, 13 September 2021. Osher Günsberg returned as the show's host. In the Grand Finale on 5 October 2021, Anastacia (as “Vampire”) was revealed as the winner, Em Rusciano (as “Dolly”) was the runner-up, and Axle Whitehead (as “Mullet”), was third.

Production
The costumes were designed and created by Australian Academy Award and BAFTA Award-Winning costume designer Tim Chappel, who is best known for his work on The Adventures of Priscilla, Queen of the Desert with Lizzy Gardiner.

The third series was filmed with a virtual audience between 3 and 24 July 2021 and premiered on 13 September, 2021.

Impact of the COVID-19 pandemic

As a result of the COVID-19 pandemic and lockdown restrictions in Greater Sydney, the in-studio audience again consisted of socially-distanced production staff wearing costumes, like the previous season. Additionally, 100 Australian viewers were selected as a virtual audience. They streamed the live performances and voted for their favourite character's performance. The performer with the least votes was unmasked in each episode. For confidentiality, the virtual audience did not witness the elimination's result or the unmasking of the performers.

Panellists and host

Radio personality Jackie O, singer-songwriter Dannii Minogue and comedians Dave Hughes and Urzila Carlson returned to the judging panel from the previous season. Osher Günsberg returned as host.

Contestants
In the third season, there were twelve regular contestants who competed in the competition. Before the season began, Network Ten revealed that the cast included Hollywood A-listers, Logie Award winners, a Brit Award winner, humanitarian, chart-toppers, Grammy Award winner and award-winning superstars. On 17 June 2021, Network Ten announced the stage identities of the first six masks. The Mullet and Piñata were announced on 10 August 2021 in the first trailer. On 24 August 2021, the final four masks were announced in the second trailer.

For the first time on the Australian version of the series, a special guest mask performed as “Rubble” from PAW Patrol in a once-off appearance on Episode 6 which was revealed to be Kyle Sandilands.

Episodes

Episode 1 (13 September)

Episode 2 (14 September)

Episode 3 (19 September)

Episode 4 (20 September)

Episode 5 (21 September)
Group number: "Dynamite" by BTS

Episode 6 (26 September)
Group number: "Head & Heart" by Joel Corry & MNEK

Special guest mask performance: "Drops of Jupiter (Tell Me)" by Train performed by Kyle Sandilands as Rubble

Episode 7 (27 September)

Episode 8 (28 September)

Episode 10 (4 October)
Group number: "Only Human" by The Jonas Brothers

Episode 11 (5 October)
Group number: "On a Night Like This" by Kylie Minogue

Reception

Ratings

See also

List of Australian television series
 The Masked Singer Franchise
It Takes Two
Australian Idol
Australia's Got Talent

References

External links
 
 
 

The Masked Singer (Australian TV series)
2021 Australian television seasons